Cobalt Networks was a maker of low-cost Linux-based servers and server appliances based in Mountain View, California. The company had 1,900 end user customers in more than 70 countries.

During the dot-com bubble, the company had a market capitalization of $6 billion despite only $22 million in annual revenue.

In 2000, the company was acquired by Sun Microsystems and in December 2003, Sun shut down the Cobalt product line.

Cobalt was the most successful web server appliance vendor of its time, and that success motivated the founding of blade server pioneer RLX Technologies.

History
The company was founded in 1996 by Vivek Mehra as Cobalt Microserver. In June 1998, the company changed its name to Cobalt Networks, Inc. 

The company introduced products as follows:

On November 5, 1999, the company became a public company via an initial public offering. Its stock price rose as much as 618% above its $22/share initial price. 

On March 23, 2000, the company announced the acquisition of Chilisoft from Charlie Crystle for 1.15 million shares of Cobalt common stock, then valued at $69.9 million.

In September 2000, Sun Microsystems announced the acquisition of the company for $2 billion in stock. The acquisition was completed on December 7, 2000.

Many disgruntled engineers left the company in the months following the acquisition.

In December 2003, Sun shut down the Cobalt product line.

References

1996 establishments in California
1999 initial public offerings
2000 disestablishments in California
2000 mergers and acquisitions
American companies established in 1996
American companies disestablished in 2000
Computer companies established in 1996
Computer companies disestablished in 2000
Defunct computer companies based in California
Defunct computer companies of the United States
Defunct online companies of the United States
Dot-com bubble
Server appliance
Sun Microsystems acquisitions